The Hunter Planet Executive Pack, subtitled "The All Australia Role Playing Game", is a light-hearted science fiction role-playing game published by the Australian game company H-PAC (Hunter Planet Adventurers Club) in 1987.

Description
The players take on the role of aliens who have travelled to Earth to go on safari and hunt the unintelligent humans that inhabit the planet. The alien tourists arrive with shoddy or non-functioning equipment and quickly learn that the humans fight back. The role-playing rules are minimal.

The pack contains:
 32-page rule book
 32-page adventure – Welcome to Sindee: An Australian Adventure
 16-page expansion module – "Exile & Arena: Hunter Planet Possibilities"
 Cover sheet listing contents
 25-page pad of character sheets
 Glossy cardstock folder to hold contents that can be used as a gamemaster's screen

Publication history
David Bruggeman created Hunter Planet in 1986, the first role-playing game to be created and published in Australia. The following year, he created a slightly revised and expanded second edition, The Hunter Planet Executive Pack.

Reception
In the December 1988 edition of Dragon (Issue #140), Ken Rolston thought that "Role-playing a yokel alien visiting Earth is heaps of fun." He liked the "simple and flippant rules", and noted that "the campaign background and adventures are served up with abundant wit and good cheer." He concluded by saying "the playing style is reminiscent of West End Games’ Paranoia game, wherein the [player characters] have lots of fun being slaughtered and otherwise abused by a relentlessly enthusiastic game master.

References

Role-playing game books
Role-playing game supplements introduced in 1987